Andrew Colville (17 December 1846 – 17 April 1881) was a Scottish international rugby union player who played for Merchistonians in Edinburgh.

Born in Edinburgh in 1848, Colville played as a Forward.

Colville played in the first ever rugby union international match for Scotland against England on 27 March 1871

He was selected again in the return match the following year. On 5 February 1872 he played for Scotland against England at The Oval.

References

1846 births
1881 deaths
Merchistonian FC players
Rugby union players from Edinburgh
Scotland international rugby union players
Scottish rugby union players
Rugby union forwards